Manolo Morán (30 December 1905, in Madrid – 27 April 1967, in Alicante) was a Spanish film actor.

Selected filmography

 Carmen fra i rossi (1939) - Il capitano Salmeron
 El huésped del sevillano (1940)
 The Unloved Woman (1940) - Pascual
 El crucero Baleares (1941) - Zafarrancho
 Madrid Carnival (1941, Short, by Edgar Neville)
 Escuadrilla (1941) - Director de la cárcel
 Sarasate (1941)
 Whirlwind (1941) - Juan Barea
 Boda en el infierno (1942) - Julián Suárez
 Goyescas (1942, by Benito Perojo) - Mesonero
 La famosa Luz María (1942, by Fernando Mignoni)
 Intrigue (1942) - Inspector Ferrer
 House of Cards (1943) - Paco
 El abanderado  (1943, by Eusebio Fernández Ardavín) - Sargento Marchena
 A Palace for Sale (1943) - Señor Ventura
 Lessons in Good Love (1944) - Eugenio
 Yo no me caso (1944)
 Paraíso sin Eva (1944) - Don Jesús
 El testamento del virrey (1944) - Quintín
 El destino se disculpa (1945, by José Luis Sáenz de Heredia) - Rufino Quintana
 The Road to Babel (1945) - Brandolet
 Noche decisiva (1945) - Perucho
 Last Stand in the Philippines (1945, by Antonio Román) - Cabo Pedro Vila
 La mantilla de Beatriz (1946)
 El emigrado (1946) - Josechu
 Por el gran premio (1947)
 Barrio (1947) - Detective Castro
 Don Quixote (1947) - Barber
 Extraño amanecer (1948)
 The Sunless Street (1948) - Manolo
 A Toast for Manolete (1948, by Florián Rey) - Antonio
 ¡Olé torero! (1949) - Pepito
 El hombre de mundo (1949)
 ¡Fuego! (1949) - Ramón
 Just Any Woman (1949) - Taxista
 Adventures of Juan Lucas (1949) - Chano
 A punta de látigo (1949)
 El duende y el rey (1950)
 Don Juan (1950) - Arturo
 Balarrasa (1950, by José Antonio Nieves Conde) - Desiderio
 I Want to Marry You (1951) - Roberto
 Black Sky (1951, by Manuel Mur Oti)
 A Tale of Two Villages (1951)
 Séptima página (1951) - Sereno
 Captain Poison (1951) - Marqués de Tomillares
 Spanish Serenade (1951) - Morgan
 From Madrid to Heaven (1952, by Rafael Gil) - Cayetano
 Persecution in Madrid (1952) - El Málaga
 Estrella de Sierra Morena (1952) - Ladeao
 Amaya (1952) - Saturnino Aizcur
 Doña Francisquita (1952) - Lorenzo
 Hermano menor (1953)
 Welcome Mr. Marshall! (1953, by Luis García Berlanga) - Manolo
 The Devil Plays the Flute (1953, by José María Forqué) - Don Cosme
 Airport (1953) - Santiago Beltrán
 Such is Madrid (1953) - Julián
 Plot on the Stage (1953) - Paco
 Nuits andalouses (1954) - Don Pedro Aragonés
 Como la tierra (1954) - Don Nicanor
 Once pares de botas (1954, by Francisco Rovira Beleta) - Ernesto
 La ciudad de los sueños (1954)
 Three are Three (1955) - Announcer (segments "Una de monstruos" and "Una de pandereta")
 The Lost City (1955) - Eliseo
 Congress in Seville (1955, by Antonio Román) - Paco Domínguez
 Good Bye, Sevilla (1955)
 Recluta con niño (1956, by Pedro Luis Ramirez) - Sargento Luis Palomares
 Afternoon of the Bulls (1956) - Jiménez
 The Big Lie (1956) - Representante de César
 ¡Aquí hay petróleo! (1956) - Zoilo Mendoza de Montesinos
 Manolo, guardia urbano (1956, by Rafael J. Salvia) - Manolo Martínez, el guardia urbano
 The Singer from Mexico (1956) - Martínez
 Un abrigo a cuadros (1957) - Doctor Dualte
 Flame Over Vietnam (1957) - Hermano Bartolomé
 Los ángeles del volante (1957) - Pepe
 El bandido generoso (1957)
 Las últimas banderas (1957)
 Historias de la feria (1958) - Gomis
 Amore a prima vista (1958) - Pedro Suárez
 Let's Make the Impossible! (1958, by Rafael Gil) - Don Sabino López
 El puente de la paz (1958) - Benito
 Luxury Cabin (1959) - Don Armando
 College Boarding House (1959, by Rafael Gil) - Minguiños
 La vida alrededor (1959) - Ceferino López Gallego 'El Agujetas'
 Litri and His Shadow (1960) - Naranjito
 Amor bajo cero (1960) - Jaime - el Camarón
 Labios rojos (1960) - Comisario Fernández
 La moglie di mio marito (1961) - Emilio
 Patricia mía (1961)
 Don José, Pepe y Pepito (1961) - Pepe Quiroga
 Alerta en el cielo (1961) - Pepe
 Darling (1961) - Don Ricardo Gravina
 El pobre García (1961) - Himself
 Vamos a contar mentiras (1962) - Bombero
 Las travesuras de Morucha (1962) - Don Claudio
 La pandilla de los once (1963) - El Zampa
 The Blackmailers (1963) - Don Fulgencio, apoderado de Juan
 A Nearly Decent Girl (1963) - Álvarez
 Como dos gotas de agua (1964) - Gregorio 'El Chopín'
 The Pleasure Seekers (1964) - Guardia Urbano (uncredited)
 Destino: Barajas (1965)
 Currito of the Cross (1965) - Copita
 Operation Delilah (1967) - Don Rémulo (final film role)

External links
 

1905 births
1967 deaths
Spanish male film actors
Male actors from Madrid
20th-century Spanish male actors